A pumpkin is a vernacular term for mature winter squash of species and varieties in the genus Cucurbita that has culinary and cultural significance but no agreed upon botanical or scientific meaning. The term pumpkin is sometimes used interchangeably with "squash" or "winter squash", and is commonly used for cultivars of Cucurbita argyrosperma, Cucurbita ficifolia, Cucurbita maxima, Cucurbita moschata, and Cucurbita pepo.

Native to North America (northeastern Mexico and the southern United States), C. pepo pumpkins are one of the oldest domesticated plants, having been used as early as 7,000 to 5,500 BC. Today, pumpkins of varied species are widely grown for food, as well as for aesthetic and recreational purposes. The pumpkin's thick shell contains edible seeds and pulp. Pumpkin pie, for instance, is a traditional part of Thanksgiving meals in Canada and the United States, and pumpkins are frequently carved as jack-o'-lanterns for decoration around Halloween, although commercially canned pumpkin purée and pumpkin pie fillings are usually made of different pumpkin varieties from those used for jack-o'-lanterns.

Etymology and terminology
According to the Oxford English Dictionary, the English word pumpkin derives from the Ancient Greek word  (romanized ), meaning 'melon'. Under this theory, the term transitioned through the Latin word  and the Middle French word  to the Early Modern English , which was changed to pumpkin by 17th-century English colonists, shortly after encountering pumpkins upon their arrival in what is now the northeastern United States.

An alternate derivation for pumpkin is the Massachusett word , meaning 'grows forth round'. This term would likely have been used by the Wampanoag people (who speak the  dialect of Massachusett) when introducing pumpkins to English Pilgrims at Plymouth Colony, located in present-day Massachusetts.

Researchers have noted that the term pumpkin and related terms like ayote and calabaza are applied to a range of winter squash with varying size and shape. The term tropical pumpkin is sometimes used for pumpkin cultivars of the species Cucurbita moschata.

Description 

Pumpkin fruits are a type of botanical berry known as a pepo. Characteristics commonly used to define "pumpkin" include smooth and slightly ribbed skin, and deep yellow to orange color. White, green, and other pumpkin colors also exist.

Most are varieties of Cucurbita maxima, and were developed through the efforts of botanical societies and enthusiast farmers.

History 

The oldest evidence of Cucurbita pepo pumpkin is fragments found in Mexico that are dated between 7,000 and 5,500 BC. Pumpkins and other squash species, alongside maize and beans, feature in the Three Sisters method of companion planting practiced by many North American indigenous societies. Although larger modern pumpkin cultivars are typically excluded as their weight may damage the other crops. Within decades after Europeans began colonizing North America, illustrations of pumpkins similar to the modern cultivars Small Sugar pumpkin and Connecticut Field pumpkin were published in Europe.

Cultivation 
Pumpkins are a warm-weather crop that is usually planted by early July in the Northern Hemisphere. Pumpkin crops may suffer if there is a lack of water, because of temperatures below , or if grown in  soils that become waterlogged. Within these conditions, pumpkins are considered hardy, and even if many leaves and portions of the vine are removed or damaged, the plant can quickly grow secondary vines to replace what was removed.

Pumpkins produce both a male and female flower, with fertilization usually performed by bees. In America, pumpkins have historically been pollinated by the native squash bee, Peponapis pruinosa, but that bee has declined, probably partly due to pesticide (imidacloprid) sensitivity. Ground-based bees, such as squash bees and the eastern bumblebee, are better suited to manage the larger pollen particles that pumpkins create. One hive per acre (0.4 hectares, or five hives per 2 hectares) is recommended by the U.S. Department of Agriculture. If there are inadequate bees for pollination, gardeners may have to hand pollinate. Inadequately pollinated pumpkins usually start growing but fail to develop.

Production 

In 2020, world production of pumpkins (including squash and gourds) was 28 million tonnes, with China accounting for 27% of the total. Ukraine and Russia each produced about one million tonnes.

In the United States 

The top pumpkin-producing states include Illinois, Indiana, Ohio, Pennsylvania, and California. Pumpkin is the state squash of Texas.

According to the Illinois Department of Agriculture, 95% of the U.S. crop intended for processing is grown in Illinois. And 41% of the overall pumpkin crop for all uses originates in the state, more than five times the nearest competitor (California, whose pumpkin industry is centered in the San Joaquin Valley), and the majority of that comes from five counties in the central part of the state. Nestlé, operating under the brand name Libby's, produces 85% of the processed pumpkin in the United States, at their plant in Morton, Illinois.

In the fall of 2009, rain in Illinois devastated the Nestlé's Libby's pumpkin crop, which, combined with a relatively weak 2008 crop depleting that year's reserves, resulted in a shortage affecting the entire country during the Thanksgiving holiday season. Another shortage, somewhat less severe, affected the 2015 crop.

The pumpkin crop grown in the western United States, which constitutes approximately 3–4% of the national crop, is primarily for the organic market. Terry County, Texas, has a substantial pumpkin industry, centered largely on miniature pumpkins. Illinois farmer Sarah Frey is called "the Pumpkin Queen of America" and sells around five million pumpkins annually, predominantly for use as lanterns.

Nutrition 

In a  amount, raw pumpkin provides  of food energy and is an excellent source (20% or more the Daily Value, DV) of provitamin A beta-carotene and vitamin A (53% DV) (table). Vitamin C is present in moderate content (11% DV), but no other nutrients are in significant amounts (less than 10% DV, table). Pumpkin is 92% water, 6.5% carbohydrate, 0.1% fat and 1% protein (table).

Uses

Cooking 

Most parts of the pumpkin plant are edible, including the fleshy shell, the seeds, the leaves, and the flowers. When ripe, the pumpkin can be boiled, steamed, or roasted. Pumpkins that are immature may be eaten as summer squash.

Shell and flesh 
In North America, pumpkins are an important part of the traditional autumn harvest, eaten mashed and making its way into soups and purées. Often, pumpkin flesh is made into pie, various kinds of which are a traditional staple of the Canadian and American Thanksgiving holidays. Pumpkin purée is sometimes prepared and frozen for later use. A 2003 review of United States processing and canning practices noted that the most common commercially-canned pumpkin varieties were Connecticut field pumpkin, Dickinson pumpkin, Kentucky field pumpkin, Boston marrow, and Golden Delicious.

In the Middle East, pumpkin is used for sweet dishes; a well-known sweet delicacy is called halawa yaqtin. In the Indian subcontinent, pumpkin is cooked with butter, sugar, and spices in a dish called kadu ka halwa. Pumpkin is used to make sambar in Udupi cuisine. In Australia and New Zealand, pumpkin is often roasted in conjunction with other vegetables. In Japan, small pumpkins are served in savory dishes, including tempura. In Myanmar, pumpkins are used in both cooking and desserts (candied). In Thailand, small pumpkins are steamed with custard inside and served as a dessert. In Vietnam, pumpkins are commonly cooked in soups with pork or shrimp. In Italy, it can be used with cheeses as a savory stuffing for ravioli. In western and central Kenya, pumpkin flesh is usually boiled or steamed.

Pumpkin is used in both alcoholic and nonalcoholic beverages.

Association of pumpkins with harvest time and pumpkin pie at Canadian and American Thanksgiving reinforce its iconic role. Starbucks turned this association into marketing with its Pumpkin Spice Latte, introduced in 2003.  This has led to a notable trend in pumpkin and spice flavored food products in North America.

Flowers 

In the southwestern United States and Mexico, pumpkin and squash flowers are a popular and widely available food item. They may be used to garnish dishes, or dredged in a batter then fried in oil.

Leaves 

In Guangxi province, China, the leaves of the pumpkin plant are consumed as a cooked vegetable or in soups. Korean cuisine makes use of pumpkin leaves, usually of C. moschata varieties.

Seeds 

Pumpkin seeds, also known as pepitas, are edible and nutrient-rich. They are about 1.5 cm (0.5 in) long, flat, asymmetrically oval, light green in color and usually covered by a white husk, although some pumpkin varieties produce seeds without them. Pumpkin seeds are a popular snack that can be found hulled or semi-hulled at grocery stores. Per ounce serving, pumpkin seeds are a good source of protein, magnesium, copper and zinc.

In Myanmar, the seeds are a popular sunflower seed substitute. Pumpkin seeds are popular with  Kenyan children, who roast them on a pan before eating them.

Pumpkin seed oil 

Pumpkin seed oil is a thick oil pressed from roasted seeds that appears red or green in color. When used for cooking or as a salad dressing, pumpkin seed oil is generally mixed with other oils because of its robust flavor. Pumpkin seed oil contains fatty acids, such as oleic acid and alpha-linolenic acid.

Other uses

Medicinal 
Pumpkins have been used as folk medicine by Native Americans to treat intestinal worms and urinary ailments, and this Native American remedy was adopted by American doctors in the early nineteenth century as an anthelmintic for the expulsion of worms. In Germany and southeastern Europe, seeds of C. pepo were also used as folk remedies to treat irritable bladder and benign prostatic hyperplasia.

In China, C. moschata seeds were also used in traditional Chinese medicine for the treatment of the parasitic disease schistosomiasis and for the expulsion of tape worms..

Animal feed 

Pumpkin seed meal from Cucurbita maxima and Cucurbita moschata have been demonstrated to improve the nutrition of eggs for human consumption, and Cucurbita pepo seed has successfully been used in place of soybean in chicken feed.

Culture

Halloween 

In the United States, the carved pumpkin was first associated with the harvest season in general, long before it became an emblem of Halloween. The practice of carving produce for Halloween originated from an Irish myth about a man named "Stingy Jack". The practice of carving pumpkin jack-o'-lanterns for the Halloween season developed from a traditional practice in Ireland as well as Scotland and other parts of the United Kingdom of carving lanterns from the turnip, mangelwurzel, or swede (rutabaga). These vegetables continue to be popular choices today as carved lanterns in Scotland and Northern Ireland, although the British purchased a million pumpkins for Halloween in 2004 reflecting the spread of pumpkin carving in the United Kingdom.

Immigrants to North America began using the native pumpkins for carving, which are both readily available and much larger – making them easier to carve than turnips. Not until 1837 does jack-o'-lantern appear as a term for a carved vegetable lantern, and the carved pumpkin lantern association with Halloween is recorded in 1866.

In 1900, an article on Thanksgiving entertaining recommended a lit jack-o'-lantern as part of the festivities that encourage kids and families to join together to make their own jack-o'-lanterns.

The traditional American pumpkin used for jack-o-lanterns is the Connecticut field variety. Kentucky Field pumpkin is also among the pumpkin cultivars grown specifically for jack-o-lantern carving.

Chunking 
Pumpkin chunking is a competitive activity in which teams build various mechanical devices designed to throw a pumpkin as far as possible. Catapults, trebuchets, ballistas and air cannons are the most common mechanisms.

Pumpkin festivals and competitions 

Growers of giant pumpkins often compete to grow the most massive pumpkins. Festivals may be dedicated to the pumpkin and these competitions. In the United States, the town of Half Moon Bay, California, holds an annual Art and Pumpkin Festival, including the World Champion Pumpkin Weigh-Off.

The record for the world's heaviest pumpkin, was established in Italy in 2021.

Folklore and fiction 
There is a connection in folklore and popular culture between pumpkins and the supernatural, such as:
 The custom of carving jack-o-lanterns from pumpkins derives from folklore about a lost soul wandering the earth.
 In the fairy tale Cinderella, the fairy godmother turns a pumpkin into a carriage for the title character, but at midnight it reverts to a pumpkin.
 In some adaptations of Washington Irving's ghost story The Legend of Sleepy Hollow, the headless horseman is said to use a pumpkin as a substitute head.

In most folklore the carved pumpkin is meant to scare away evil spirits on All Hallows' Eve (that is, Halloween), when the dead were purported to walk the earth.

Cultivars

The species and varieties include many economically important cultivars with a variety of different shapes, colors, and flavors that are grown for different purposes. Variety is used here interchangeably with cultivar, but not with species or taxonomic variety.

See also 
 List of culinary fruits
 List of gourds and squashes
 List of squash and pumpkin dishes

References

External links 

 

Crops originating from Pre-Columbian North America
Crops originating from the Americas
Edible nuts and seeds
Fruit vegetables
Halloween food
Plant common names
Staple foods
Thanksgiving food